Bhupendra Chandra Datta Bhowmik (19 February 1940 – 9 September 1997), also known as Bhupen Datta Bhowmik or Bhupen Datta Bhaumik or Bhupen Dutta Bhowmik, was an Indian Bengali journalist from Agartala, Tripura. He was the founder and chief editor of the Bengali language daily newspaper Dainik Sambad. He was awarded "Friends of Liberation War Honour" posthumously in 2012 from Bangladesh for his outstanding contributions in the Bangladesh Liberation War.

See also 

 List of Indian journalists
 Bengali-language newspapers

References

External links 
 https://thesamacharbharat.in/bhupendra-chandra-datta-bhowmik-media-centre-set-up-at-agartala-press-club-with-the-financial-support-of-dainik-sambad-has-started-its-journey-on-sunday/
 https://tripurachronicle.in/Tripura/annual-general-meeting-of-agartala-press-club-held-38057.cms
 https://www.tripuraindia.in/update/index/21st-bhupen-datta-memorial-tennis-pranoy-debroy-eases-towards-final

Journalists from Tripura
1940 births
1997 deaths
People of the Bangladesh Liberation War